The Battle at Fort Utah (also known as Fort Utah War or Provo War) was a battle between the Timpanogos Tribe and remnants of the Nauvoo Legion at Fort Utah in modern-day Provo, Utah. The Timpanogos people initially tolerated the presence of the settlers, and the two groups enjoyed some moments of mutual friendship. However, after three Mormons murdered a Timpanogos man called Old Bishop for stealing, the Timpanogos then took around 50 Mormon cattle, settlers in Fort Utah petitioned to go to war with the Timpanogos. Isaac Higbee, Parley P. Pratt and Willard Richards convinced Brigham Young to exterminate any Timpanogos hostile to the Mormon settlement. Young sent the Nauvoo Legion down with Captain George D. Grant and later sent General Daniel H. Wells to lead the army. After the Timpanogos defended themselves from their village and an abandoned cabin, they fled their camp. The Mormons pursued the Timpanogos from Chief Old Elk's tribe and any other Timpanogos they found in the valley, killing Timpanogos from Chief Pareyarts or Para-yah (Old Elk)'s tribe. The Nauvoo Legion killed some Timpanogos.

Buildup

Mormon settlers kill Timpanogos at Battle Creek

Around February 1849, Dimick B. Huntington spoke with Timpanogos leader Little Chief about some of the settlers' missing cattle. Little Chief said that Roman Nose and Blue Shirt were great thieves who had decided to live off of the settlers' cattle all winter. Little Chief said that the Mormons should kill these renegades, perhaps out of fear that his tribe would be blamed and killed for the missing cattle. Captain John Scott took fifty men into Utah Valley to put a "final end" to the "depredations.". On March 3, 1849, Scott's men made their way down the Provo river and asked Little Chief and his camp about where the renegades were. Little Chief's tribe was understandably worried about the fifty armed men, and Little Chief agreed to show Scott where the renegades were. Little Chief's two sons guided Scott's men to the renegade's camp near Battle Creek Canyon. Scott's men surrounded the camp, which consisted of several men and their families. The Timpanogos refused to talk and opened fire on the company, even though they were considerably weaker. Scott's men dropped rocks on the renegades in the creek, which caused the women and children to surrender. Pareyarts and Opecarry (aka Stick-in-the-Head), leaders of local Timpanogos tribes, watched the settlers "relentlessly shoot down" the remaining Timpanogos. This contributed to their later mistrust of the settlers during the events preceding the Battle at Fort Utah.

Initial Mormon settlement
On March 10, 1849, Brigham Young assigned 30 families to settle Utah Valley, with John S. Higbee as president and translator Dimick B. Huntington and Isaac Higbee as counselors. They headed towards Timpanogos territory with 30 families or 150 people. It is likely that the settlers arrived on April 1 and began construction of the fort on April 3. The Timpanogos viewed this as an invasion of their territory and sacred land.  As the settlers came in, they were actively blocked by a group of Timpanogos led by An-kar-tewets with warnings that trespassing would be met with death and destruction. D. Robert Carter suggests that An-kar-tewets was probably demanding a tribute for the travels of the caravan through their territory. Later, a Timpanogos chief met with Huntington, possibly Black Elk. Huntington said that the settlement would be beneficial for the Timpanogos. The chief consented to let the Mormons settle there after Huntington rose his hand and swore by the sun god that they would not try to drive the Timpanogos off their lands or take away their rights.

The settlers built a stockade called Fort Utah and armed it with a twelve-pound cannon to intimidate the Timpanogos. They also built several log houses, surrounded by a  palisade 20 by 40 rods in size, with gates in the east and west ends, and a middle deck for the cannon. The surrounding land was divided into 58,  lots.

Relations between the two groups started familiarly, with Mormons and Timpanogos fishing and gambling together. Brigham Young disapproved of their familiarity with one another and advised Huntington and Alexander Williams to be the sole traders. Parley P. Pratt visited and made rules against gambling with the Timpanogos and against shooting near the fort.

The fort was built on the sacred grounds for the annual fish festival and very close to the main Timpanogos village on the Provo River. The settlers fenced off pastures. Their cattle would eat and trample the seeds and berries that were an important part of the Timpanogos diet. They used gill nets to catch fish, which didn't leave any fish for the Timpanogos to eat. With the traditional sources of food gone, they soon experienced massive starvation. The settlers also brought measles, which was foreign to the Timpanogos, and they began dying in large numbers.

Old Bishop's murder
In August, a Timpanog named Old Bishop was murdered by Rufus Stoddard, Richard Ivie, and Gerome Zabrisky over a shirt they wanted from him. Another account from Thomas Orr states that the Timpanogos agreed not to take the settlers' cattle if they would not kill their wild game. Old Bishop discovered the men hunting deer, expressed his displeasure, and the men killed him. They filled his body with rocks and threw it in the Provo River.  The men went back to Fort Utah and openly bragged about the murder.  The Timpanogos found the body and discovered that Richard Ivie was involved in the murder. The Timpanogos were angry, and demanded that the murderers be handed over, to which the settlers refused. The Timpanogos asked for material compensation for Old Bishop's death according to Timpanogos custom, which the settlers also refused, which enraged the Timpanogos, given how they were sharing prime pasture and fishing land. Some Timpanogos shot at cattle that were trespassing on their land or took the settlers' corn in response.

In October, apostle Charles C. Rich negotiated a peace treaty, and Brigham Young again advised Fort Utah not to hold the Timpanogos as equals, but to "have dominion" over them. Winter was especially hard and Timpanogos took 5060 cattle for food. Travelling forty-niners traded with the Timpanogos, giving them more guns and ammunition. Williams kicked Pareyarts out of Mrs. Hunt's house after he asked for some medicine for measles, and later, three of Mrs. Hunt's cattle were missing. By January 1850, settlers of Fort Utah reported to officials in Salt Lake City that the situation was getting dangerous. They wanted a military party to attack the Timpanogos. Not knowing the story of Old Bishop's murder, Brigham Young noted that a white man wouldn't be murdered over stealing an item like a shirt or ox, and said that the Timpanogos shouldn't be killed over theft.

Mormon decision to go to war
On January 31, 1850, Isaac Higbee, who had replaced John Higbee as bishop of Fort Utah, met with Governor Brigham Young, militia leader General Daniel H. Wells and the First Presidency and the Quorum of the Twelve Apostles to petition Young for a war order. He stated that all the occupants of Fort Utah were in agreement that they should go to war. Apostles Parley P. Pratt and Willard Richards argued for the killing of the Timpanogos, since losing Fort Utah would cut off communication to the southern colonies. Brigham Young also was concerned losing Fort Utah would disrupt his plans to have a route to California and occupy every fertile valley. Brigham Young ordered an extermination campaign against the Timpanogos, with orders to kill all the Timpanogos men, but save the women and children who behaved. General Wells drafted the extermination order as Special Order No. 2 and sent them to Captain George D. Grant.  In his letter, he told Grant "Take no hostile Indians as prisoners" and "let none escape but do the work up clean".

On February 1, Brigham Young met with Captain Howard Stansbury of the U.S. Topographical engineers who was in Utah mapping Utah Lake and the Great Salt Lake. Stansbury had also been a victim of cattle theft and supported Young's decision to go to war with supplies and the services of his physician. On February 2, Brigham Young announced his decision to the general assembly. General Wells called for volunteers. On February 4, Captain Grant headed towards Fort Utah, followed shortly by Major Andrew Lytle.

Battle

The Timpanogos had fortified their village with barricades made from stacked logs and fallen timber. The fortifications housed seventy warriors and their families. The Timpanogos were headed by Pareyarts, who was sick from the measles. Some Timpanogos who were friends with some of the settlers sought shelter in Fort Utah before the battle, including Antonga, whom the Mormons called "Black Hawk."

The Nauvoo Legion was sent from Salt Lake City and on February 8, they engaged the Timpanogos in battle. Their initial strategy was to encircle the Timpanogos village and kill all hostile Timpanogos. The Timpanogos fortified themselves in an abandoned cabin, and the first day ended in a stalemate. Pareyarts's braves were probably joined by warriors from villages on the Spanish Fork river and Peteetneet Creek. The next day, the soldiers mounted shields on sledges and the defending Timpanogos suffered about ten casualties and Chief Opecarry was wounded. Joseph Higbee, son of Isaac Higbee, was the only casualty of the Mormons. The Timpanogos fled during the night after the second day of fighting. They split into two groups. Pareyarts took a small group of wounded and sick and fled to Rock Canyon. Opecarry took the rest of the Timpanogos towards the Spanish Fork River. Black Hawk reported to the settlers that the village was deserted the next morning; about eight bodies were found in the camp, killed possibly by exposure to the cold or shots from Nauvoo Legion.

After having received a letter about the poor attitude of the settlers in working with Wells's troops, Brigham Young sent Wells to lead the army with the expanded mission "not to leave the valley until every Indian was out." On February 11, Wells split the army into two. One contingent, under Captain Grant's command, followed the trail of some Timpanogos who had fled up Rock Canyon; Black Hawk helped the militia to track the fleeing Timpanogos.  They set up camp at the mouth of the canyon, where they took 23 prisoners and found about a dozen dead bodies, including the body of Pareyarts. Further up the canyon, they found more tepees and killed more Timpanogos and took more prisoners.  Some of the prisoners were later executed.  Ope-carry, Patsowet, and their families: six women and seven children, managed to flee over the mountains using snowshoes they made in the canyon. According to Edward Tullidge, Pareyarts's young, beautiful, and intelligent wife was found dead in Rock Canyon. One account says that one of the Timpanogos women killed herself by falling from a precipice. It is possible that the woman was Pareyarts's wife, and local legends say that Squaw Peak was named for her.

The other contingent, led by Wells, divided into smaller parties and searched the southern valley for Timpanogos to kill.  They first attacked a village along the Spanish Fork River, and then a village on Peteetneet Creek.  On February 13, 15–20 Timpanogos families surrendered to Captain Grant in modern-day Lake Shore, Utah.  Wells wrote a letter to Brigham Young asking what he should do.  On February 14, Brigham Young wrote a letter instructing Wells to kill them if they did not surrender. Lieutenant Gunnison of the Stansbury Expedition reported that the Mormons promised to be friendly to the Timpanogos men. They held them prisoner overnight; but then in the morning lined up the Timpanogos men to be executed in front of their families. Some attempted to flee across the frozen lake, but the Mormons ran after them on horseback and shot them. At least eleven Timpanogos men were killed; one account reports as many as twenty. The family members were then taken captive.

Later in the day on February 14, the Nauvoo Legion spotted five more Timpanogos men on horseback, and killed three of them. On February 15, they killed three more Timpanogos men on the Peteetneet river, probably members of Chief Peteetneet's tribe.  On February 17, they killed another Timpanogos person in Rock Canyon. In total, one militia man and an estimated 102 Timpanogos were killed.

Aftermath

A government surgeon, James Blake, went to the execution site and cut off the Timpanogos' heads for later examination. Captain Howard Stansbury wanted the heads for "future scientific study" and planned to take them to Washington. Around 50 decapitated Timpanogos heads were gathered.  They were supposed to be shipped to Salt Lake, but they were held up to be displayed in front of the prisoners at Fort Utah as a warning. The prisoners, including those who sought shelter in the fort before the war, were left in the cold under the fort's cannon, some of whom were dying from exposure.  William Potter, who was upset at the condition, petitioned for blankets for the prisoners, which were eventually given.  More than forty prisoners, mostly women and children, were taken and placed with Mormon families "as servants" in Salt Lake City "for the purpose of weaning them from their savage pursuits, and bringing them up in the habits of civilized and Christian life".  It did not go as planned, as many died and most escaped to live with other Ute bands, especially in the spring. News of the enslavement reached the US Government, and became one of the first priorities of Edward Cooper after he was appointed as Indian Agent of Utah later that year.

Chief Peteetneet, Chief Tabby-To-Kwanah and Chief Grospean discovered the decapitated bodies and asked Fort Utah about the bodies. Patsowet returned to the Salt Lake area and killed livestock belonging to Mormons in retaliation for the violence done to his tribe and threatened to kill Walkara's animals. Patsowet was then arrested and put on trial for the murder of the Mormon militiaman killed at Fort Utah. Patsowet was convicted and executed.

References 

Conflicts in 1850
19th-century Mormonism
Native American history of Utah
Nauvoo Legion
The Church of Jesus Christ of Latter-day Saints in Utah
1850 in Utah Territory
Ute tribe
Wars between the United States and Native Americans
Religion-based wars
Mormonism and Native Americans
Mormonism and violence
Fort Utah
Slavery of Native Americans
History of slavery in Utah
Wars fought in Utah
February 1850 events